Stigmella magdalenae is a moth of the family Nepticulidae. It is found from Scandinavia and Finland to the Pyrenees, Italy and Bulgaria, and from Ireland to central Russia and Ukraine.

The wingspan is 4–5 mm. Adults are on wing in July.

The larvae feed on Amelanchier ovalis, Amelanchier spicata, Cotoneaster integerrimus, Malus sylvestris, Sorbus aucuparia and Sorbus torminalis. They mine the leaves of their host plant. The mine consists of a narrow corridor. It sometimes follows the leaf margin for a while, more often it is found along a major vein. The frass is concentrated in a narrow, regularly interrupted central line.

External links
Fauna Europaea
bladmineerders.nl
Swedish moths
Stigmella magdalenae  images at Consortium for the Barcode of Life
lepiforum.de

Nepticulidae
Moths described in 1950
Moths of Europe